Madison County Schools can refer to:

Madison County Schools (Alabama)
Madison County Schools (Florida)
Madison County Schools (Kentucky)
Madison County Schools (North Carolina)
Madison County School District (Georgia)
Madison County School District (Mississippi)